The 2005 UAW-DaimlerChrysler 400 was a NASCAR Nextel Cup Series race held on March 13, 2005 at Las Vegas Motor Speedway in Las Vegas, Nevada. Contested at 267 laps on the  speedway, it was the 3rd race of the 2005 NASCAR Nextel Cup Series season. Jimmie Johnson of Hendrick Motorsports won the race.

Qualifying

Summary
The UAW-DaimlerChrysler 400 was run on Sunday, March 13, 2005 and is run over 267 laps of the Las Vegas Motor Speedway in Las Vegas, Nevada.

Ryan Newman started on the pole. Greg Biffle soon took over. The 1st caution came out on lap 12 when Dale Earnhardt Jr. touched Brian Vickers coming into turn 1. Bobby Labonte and Ricky Rudd were also involved. All 4 cars were out of the race. The racer estates on lap 20 and Kurt Busch had the lead, only for Biffle took it again soon afterwards.

Newman then got up to within 0.5 seconds of Biffle, and the lead remained for a long green-flag run; this would end on lap 59 when Robby Gordon's engine blew up, bringing out the 2nd caution. Sterling Marlin stayed out to lead a lap but at the restart, Newman was led over by Travis Kvapil and Greg Biffle in 2nd and 3rd positions respectively. Shortly after the restart, a crash occurred on lap 65, when Matt Kenseth nudged the back of Elliott Sadler's car; this would bring out the 3rd caution. Carl Edwards and Tony Stewart were also involved, though the latter's car only received minor damage.

The race restarted came on lap 70 with Newman taking the lead, having Kvapil, Jimmie Johnson, and Biffle behind him. On lap 77, Kenseth went a lap behind after a tire went down as a result of his crash with Sadler earlier.

Lap 86 brought out the 4th caution when Jason Leffler, trying to get onto pit road, got pushed by Ken Schrader. Most drivers pitted, with Kasey Kahne ending up in the lead from Newman and Kvapil. Ku. Busch was leading from Johnson and Biffle when the 6th caution came out on lap 126. An error in the pits, however, saw Kvapil drop to 23rd place.

Jimmie Johnson took the lead on lap 147. On lap 175, the 7th caution flew for debris, with Johnson still out in front. Newman took the green from Johnson, Busch, and Biffle. Trouble occurred when Scott Riggs brought out the eighth caution with 74 laps to go, with Sadler getting the free pass.

Newman, Johnson, and Joe Nemechek led at the restart, with Johnson swiftly regaining the lead. Debris brought out yet another caution with 62 laps to go. Newman and Johnson battled for the lead at the restart. With 44 to go, Hermie Sadler crashed into the inside wall bringing out another caution with Johnson leading over Gordon. The battle resumed with 39 laps left. Newman got into the back of Gordon with 34 laps to go, which caused them to lose 3 positions.

With 15 to go, Jimmie Johnson had got a 1.5-second lead over Kyle Busch, who was 5 seconds ahead of Ku. Busch. An error by Johnson lost him 0.8 seconds, but he then extended his lead again, and he won from the Busch brothers.

Results

Race Statistics
 Time of race: 3:18:32 
 Average Speed: 
 Pole Speed: 173.745
 Cautions: 10 for 46 laps
 Margin of Victory: 1.661 sec
 Lead changes: 25
 Percent of race run under caution: 17.2%         
 Average green flag run: 20.1 laps

References

2005 UAW-DaimlerChrysler 400
2005 UAW-DaimlerChrysler 400
NASCAR races at Las Vegas Motor Speedway